William Birch (10 February 1863 – 11 December 1940) was an English cricketer. Birch was a right-handed batsman who bowled right-arm medium-fast. He was born at Isleworth, Middlesex.

Birch made two first-class appearances for Middlesex in the 1887 against Surrey at Lords, and Oxford University at Chiswick Park Cricket Ground. He scored 6 runs in his two matches and took 2 wickets at an average of 47.50.

He died at the town of his birth on 11 December 1940.

References

External links
William Birch at ESPNcricinfo
William Birch at CricketArchive

1863 births
1940 deaths
People from Isleworth
English cricketers
Middlesex cricketers